Sawmill Hollow is a valley in Morgan County in the U.S. state of Missouri.

Sawmill Hollow was named for the presence of a sawmill  which operated until forests were cleared.

References

Valleys of Morgan County, Missouri
Valleys of Missouri